Fera Island is one of the chain of islands forming Buala Bay, in Isabel Province, Solomon Islands. The other islands are Juakau, Tasia, Karuo and Sulei.

Fera Airport is on Fera Island.

References

Islands of the Solomon Islands